Ciechanów  is a city in north-central Poland. From 1975 to 1998, it was the capital of the Ciechanów Voivodeship. Since 1999, it has been situated in the Masovian Voivodeship. As of December 2021, it has a population of 43,495.

History
The settlement is first mentioned in a 1065 document by Bolesław II the Bold handing the land over to the church. The medieval gord in Ciechanów numbered approximately 3,000 armed men, and together with the region of Mazovia, it became part of the emerging Polish state in the late 10th century.

In 1254, Ciechanów is mentioned as the seat of a castellany (Rethiborius Castellanus de Techanow (Racibor, Kasztelan Ciechanowa)). In 1400 Janusz I of Czersk granted Ciechanów town privileges. The area eventually become a separate duchy with Casimir I of Warsaw using the title "dominus et heres lub dominus et princeps Ciechanoviensis." In the Middle Ages, the defensive gord of Ciechanów protected northern Mazovia from raids of Lithuanians, Yotvingians, Old Prussians and later, the Teutonic Knights. It is not known when it was granted a town charter. This must have happened before 1475, as a document from that year, issued by Duke Janusz II of Warsaw, states that Ciechanów has a Chełmno town charter.

In the period between the 14th and 16th centuries, Ciechanów prospered with the population reaching 5,000. In the late 14th century, Siemowit III, Duke of Masovia, began construction of a castle, while his son Janusz I of Warsaw invited the Augustinians, who in the mid-15th century began construction of a church and an abbey. The Augustinian Friars were brought to Ciechanów in 1358 by Duke Siemowit III. They experienced the most turbulent times during the Reformation. From the 17th century, the Augustinians’ pastoral presence was growing in the towns. The monastery – characterised by mild observance – was usually inhabited by 4 to 7 monks. It ceased to exist in 1864 when monasteries were dissolved.

In 1526, together with all Mazovia, Ciechanów was incorporated to the Kingdom of Poland. It was a royal city of Poland, the seat of the Land of Ciechanów, a separate administrative unit within the Masovian Voivodeship in the Greater Poland Province of the Polish Crown.

The town was handed over to Bona Sforza, as her dowry. Ciechanów prospered until the Swedish invasion of Poland (1655-1660), when the town was burned and ransacked.

After the second partition of Poland (1793), Ciechanów briefly became seat of a newly created voivodeship. In 1795, it was annexed by the Kingdom of Prussia, and reduced to the status of a provincial town in Przasnysz county. In 1806, during the Napoleonic Wars, Ciechanów was ransacked and destroyed. In 1807 it became part of the short-lived Polish Duchy of Warsaw. Since 1815, the town belonged to Russian-controlled Congress Poland. Its residents actively supported Polish rebellions. In the late 19th century, Ciechanów emerged as a local trade and industry center. In 1864, a brewery was opened, in 1867 it became seat of a county, in 1877 a rail station of the Vistula River Railroad was completed, and in 1882 a sugar refinery was opened. The period of prosperity was short, as during World War I, Ciechanów was almost completely destroyed.

In the Second Polish Republic, Ciechanów remained seat of a county in Warsaw Voivodeship. In 1938, its population was 15,000, and the town was a military garrison, home to the 11th Uhlan Regiment of Marshall Edward Smigly-Rydz.

World War II

Ciechanów was captured by the Wehrmacht on the night of September 3/4, 1939. The town was annexed by Nazi Germany and was known as Zichenau in German. It was the capital of Regierungsbezirk Zichenau, a new subdivision of the Province of East Prussia. The vast majority of the Polish and Jewish population was seen as racially inferior and Germany planned its eventual annihilation. The Einsatzgruppe V entered the city on September 10, 1939, and carried out first mass arrests among local Polish intelligentsia. Residents were imprisoned in Gestapo jails established in municipal buildings and the Town Hall. The Germans carried out mass searches of Polish and Jewish homes, offices and organizations, as well as synagogues, which were desecrated and looted. Several hundred Poles were transported from the jail in Ciechanów and murdered in large massacres in the nearby village of Ościsłowo as part of Intelligenzaktion. Local disabled people were also murdered in Ościsłowo on February 20, 1940. Local teachers were arrested in October and November 1939, and deported to the Soldau concentration camp, where they were murdered in December 1939, and some were also murdered in the Mauthausen concentration camp.

Poles were also subjected to expulsions. Around 600 people were expelled in December 1939, further expulsions were carried out in subsequent years. In Ciechanów, the Germans also organized a transit camp for Poles deported for forced labor to the areas of Klaipeda, Tilsit (Sovetsk) and Königsberg (Kaliningrad), and a forced labor "education" camp.

Before World War II, Ciechanów was home to a large Jewish community of 1,800, but during the Nazi German occupation, in November 1942, the majority of the Jewish community were transported to the Red Forest (Czerwony Bór) northeast of town and murdered in a mass shooting. During the war many Polish Jews and resistance fighters were executed by the Germans in the castle.

On January 17, 1945, Ciechanów was captured from Nazi Germany by the Red Army, and was restored to Poland after the war.

Demographics
Detailed data as of 31 December 2021:

Number of inhabitants by year

Monuments and sights
 Castle of the Mazovian Dukes from the 14th century, alongside the Łydynia river
 Farska Hill – fortified settlement from the 7th century with a Neo-Gothic belfry from the 19th century
 Church of the Nativity of the Virgin Mary, Late Gothic building from the 16th century
 Monastery Augustinian Church from the 16th and 18th centuries
 City Hall from the 19th century
 Muzeum Szlachty Mazowieckiej (Museum of Mazovian Nobility)
 Parish cemetery which has functioned since 1828
 Park Nauki Torus ("Torus Science Park") with the hyperboloid water tower, built in 1972

Economy

The Browar Ciechan brewery is located in the town.

Education
 Państwowa Wyższa Szkoła Zawodowa
 Wyższa Szkoła Biznesu i Zarządzania

Transport
Through the town are leading two national roads, numbered 50 and 60; and three voivodship roads, numbered 615, 616, 617. Just 25 km away to the West there is the national road number 7, a part of the E77 European route.

The Ciechanów railway station is on the Warsaw - Gdańsk railway, however the Warsaw - Gdańsk - Gdynia express train, colloquially referred as 'Pendolino', does not stop here. Other trains offer connections to Warsaw, Olsztyn, Gdańsk, Gdynia, Kołobrzeg, Kraków and Łódź.

Sports
Ciechanów is home to handball club , which competes in the I liga (Polish second tier), and to football club , which competes in the lower divisions.

Notable people

 Jan Kazimierz Krasiński (1607–1669), Polish official and nobleman, royal secretary of Polish King Sigismund III Vasa
 Ludwik Krasiński (1609–1644), Polish royal courtier and official
 Zygmunt Krasiński (1812–1859), Polish poet, considered one of Poland's Three Bards
 Maria Konopnicka (1842–1910), Polish poet and novelist
 Aleksander Świętochowski (1849–1938), Polish writer, educator, and philosopher
 Stefan Żeromski (1864–1925), Polish novelist and dramatist
 Ignacy Mościcki (1867–1946), Polish chemist, politician, and President of Poland
 Roza Robota (1921–1945), Polish-Jewish resistance member during World War II
 Mieczysław Jagielski (1924–1997), Polish politician and economist
 Zbigniew Siemiątkowski (born 1957), Polish politician
 Dorota Rabczewska (Doda) (born 1984), Polish singer-songwriter
 Kasia Struss (born 1987), Polish model
 Quebonafide (born 1991), Polish rapper
 Adam Morawski (born 1994), Polish handball player, member of the Polish national handball team
 Ania Ahlborn, Polish-American novelist
 Maciej Dobrzyński (born 2007), Polish activist

International relations

Twin towns – Sister cities
Ciechanów is twinned with:
  Meudon, France
  Haldensleben, Germany
  Khmelnytskyi, Ukraine
  Brezno, Slovakia

References

External links

Wojciech Górczyk, Ciechanów – zarys dziejów do XV w., Kultura i Historia, Uniwersytet Marii Curie Skłodowskiej w lublinie,19/2011, ISSN 1642-9826
Official homepage
Architecture of Ciechanow (only in Polish)
Czas Ciechanowa (Local weekly magazine, local press)
 Jewish Community in Ciechanów on Virtual Shtetl
Ciechanów city forum
Ciechanow website www.ciechanowonline.pl  - all you need to know about Ciechanow, including a contemporary gallery of the city
Site dedicated to preserving the memory of Ciechanów's Jewish community, including an English translation of the memorial book
Website of Ciechanow City www.eciechanow.pl – City news, history of Ciechanow, information where you can eat, sleep and dance
Castle of the Dukes of Mazovia in Ciechanów (en)
Museum of the Mazovian Nobility (en)

Cities and towns in Masovian Voivodeship
Ciechanów County
Płock Governorate
Warsaw Voivodeship (1919–1939)
Holocaust locations in Poland